Stigmatogobius elegans is a species of fish in the goby family, Gobiidae. It is found in Luzon, Philippines.

References

External links 

 Stigmatogobius elegans at fishbase

elegans
Fish described in 2005
Fish of the Philippines
Fauna of Luzon
Taxa named by Helen K. Larson